The first USS Rhode Island was a side-wheel steamer in the United States Navy, commissioned in 1861.

Rhode Island was built in New York City, in 1860 by Lupton & McDermut as John P. King; burned and rebuilt and renamed Eagle in 1861 before being purchased by the U.S. Navy on 27 June 1861 from Spofford, Tileston & Company, at New York; renamed Rhode Island; and commissioned at New York Navy Yard on 29 July 1861, Commander Stephen D. Trenchard in command.

Service history

Supply ship
During the American Civil War, Rhode Island was employed as a supply ship, visiting various ports and ships with mail, paymasters officers stores, medicine, and other supplies. She departed New York on her first cruise on 31 July 1861, returning on 2 September. While cruising off Galveston, Texas, Rhode Island captured the schooner Venus attempting to run the blockade with a cargo of lead, copper, tin, and wood. During the remainder of 1861 and 1862 Rhode Island continued her essential support duties. Departing Philadelphia on 5 February 1862, she supplied 98 vessels with various stores before returning to Hampton Roads, Virginia, on 18 March; on another trip from 5 April to 20 May 1862 she supplied 118 vessels. Assigned to support the Gulf Blockading Squadron from 17 April 1862, Rhode Island chased and forced ashore the British schooner Richard O'Bryan near San Luis Pass on 4 July 1862.

Loss of USS Monitor

On 29 December 1862 Rhode Island departed Hampton Roads with the famous Monitor in tow and Passaic in company. As the ships rounded Cape Hatteras on the evening of 30 December, they encountered a heavy storm. Monitors pumps were unable to control flooding caused by underwater leaks so that the order to abandon ship had to be given. Before Monitors crew could be completely transferred to Rhode Island, the ironclad sank, taking four officers and 12 enlisted men with her. Seven Rhode Island crewman were awarded the Medal of Honor for their actions during the sinking: Ordinary Seaman Luke M. Griswold, Seaman Lewis A. Horton, Landsman John Jones, Captain of the Afterguard Hugh Logan, Seaman George Moore, Coxswain Charles H. Smith, and Coxswain Maurice Wagg.

Enforcing the blockade
On 29 January 1863 Rhode Island was ordered to the West Indies to join in the search for the Confederate steamers Oreto and Alabama. Unable to help locate the Confederate warships, she did succeed in driving the blockade runner Margaret and Jessie ashore at Stirrup Cay on 30 May. Continuing her cruising on the Atlantic coast, Rhode Island achieved a fourth victory on 16 August when she captured the British blockade runner Cronstadt north of Man of War Bay, Abaco, Bahamas with a cargo of cotton, turpentine, and tobacco.

Conversion to cruiser
With defective boilers requiring repair, Rhode Island entered Boston Navy Yard on 28 March 1864 for overhaul and was decommissioned there on 21 April. Extensive alterations were made transforming Rhode Island into an auxiliary cruiser mounting one 11-inch gun, eight 8-inch (203 mm) guns, one 30-pounder (14 kg) Parrott rifle, and one 12-pounder (5 kg) rifle. Ordered to tow the monitor  from Boston to New York on 26 September 1864, Rhode Island recommissioned on 3 October 1864 and joined the North Atlantic Blockading Squadron soon afterward.

Employed in cruising along Confederate-controlled coasts Rhode Island's duty was highlighted by the capture of the British blockade runner Vixen on 1 December 1864. Sailing from Hampton Roads on 11 December with the monitor  in tow, Rhode Island joined the squadron attacking Fort Fisher, taking part in the first assault on 24 December and the second, successful attempt of 13–15 January 1865. Signal Quartermaster Charles H. Foy was awarded the Medal of Honor for his actions during the Second Battle of Fort Fisher.

Ordered to tow the monitor  from Federal Point, North Carolina, to Norfolk, Virginia, on 16 January 1865, Rhode Island subsequently cruised in company with the seagoing monitor  in March. In May Rhode Island made a cruise to Mobile, Alabama, returning to Hampton Roads on 22 May.

Maintained in commission in the years immediately following the end of the Civil War, Rhode Island's first duty was to help bring the formidable former Confederate armored ram Stonewall to the United States.

After the Civil War
Throughout 1866, Rhode Island continued to cruise in the Atlantic and West Indies, from April 1866 flying the flag of Rear Admiral James S. Palmer. On 15 January 1866, Seaman William B. Stacy was awarded the Medal of Honor for rescuing a drowning crewmate while the ship was in the harbor of Cap-Haïtien, Haiti. Calling once at Halifax in 1867 before being decommissioned, Rhode Island was sold to G. W. Quintard on 1 October 1867. Redocumented as Charleston on 8 November 1867, the side-wheeler remained in merchant service until abandoned in 1885.

See also

Confederate States Navy
Union Navy
Union Blockade

Footnotes

References
Bauer, Karl Jack and Roberts, Stephen S. (1991): Register of Ships of the U.S. Navy, 1775–1990: Major Combatants, Greenwood Publishing Group, .

External links
Photos of USS Rhode Island

Ships of the Union Navy
Ships built in New York City
Steamships of the United States Navy
Gunboats of the United States Navy
American Civil War patrol vessels of the United States
American Civil War auxiliary ships of the United States
Rhode Island in the American Civil War
1860 ships
Stores ships of the United States Navy